Xochimilco may refer to:
Xochimilco, a delegación of the Mexican Federal District
Xochimilco (pre-Columbian city), a pre-Columbian city-state
Lake Xochimilco